Heathergreen is an unincorporated community in Pickaway County, in the U.S. state of Ohio.

References

Unincorporated communities in Pickaway County, Ohio
Unincorporated communities in Ohio